Nayapul (meaning 'new bridge') is a suburb of Hyderabad, Telangana, India. It gets its name from the bridge that was built during the time of the Nizams called as Nayapul because there was already another bridge called Puaranapul.

Places of interest

It is very close to the historic Charminar. The famous Salar Jung Museum and Afzal Gunj Mosque is located here. This is a major shopping center for the people of old city.  In the close by Madina area, there are some popular Hyderabadi restaurants like the Hotel Shadab which serve popular Hyderabadi dishes including Hyderabadi haleem and udupi restaurants.

Transport
Buses are run by TSRTC connect nayapul to important parts of the city. The closest MMTS Train station is at Nampally.

References

Neighbourhoods in Hyderabad, India
Bridges in Telangana